Dick Dever (born February 11, 1952) is an American politician. He is a member of the North Dakota State Senate from the 32nd District, serving since 2001. He is a member of the Republican party.

References

Living people
1952 births
Presidents pro tempore of the North Dakota Senate
Republican Party North Dakota state senators
People from Sterling, Colorado
21st-century American politicians